Mark Leslie Fox (born January 13, 1969) is a men's college basketball coach who last coached for the California Golden Bears of the Pac-12 Conference. He finished his four year career at California with a 38−87 record. He spent nine seasons (2009 to 2018) as the head coach of the Georgia Bulldogs and was previously the head coach for the Nevada Wolf Pack for five seasons.

Coaching career

Nevada
Fox was the head coach for the Nevada Wolf Pack basketball team from 2004 to 2009. While with the Wolf Pack, Fox compiled an overall record of 123–43. He also guided the Wolf Pack to five postseason appearances in five years including three NCAA tournaments. The Wolf Pack also won the Western Athletic Conference regular-season championship in 2005, 2006, 2007, and 2008. In 2006, the team won the conference tournament as well.

Fox was named conference coach of the year three times (2005 to 2007) while with Nevada.

Georgia
On April 3, 2009, it was announced that Fox would leave Nevada for the same position at the University of Georgia.
In his first year as head coach, Fox and the Bulldogs went 14–17 and finished sixth in the Southeastern Conference East. The highlights of the season included victories over the Tennessee Volunteers and three top 25 teams.

In 2011, Fox's second season, the Bulldogs made improvements. The 2010–11 team won 21 games, finished 3rd in the SEC East and made it to the NCAA tournament for the first time since 2008. In 2011–12, the Bulldogs posted another sub-.500 record and finished near the bottom of the SEC with a 5–11 record.

After making the NIT in 2013–14, Fox got his team back to the NCAA tournament in 2014–15, narrowly falling to Michigan State in the first round. That Spartans team would eventually make it to the Final Four.

While at Georgia, Fox has placed three players in the NBA, Travis Leslie, Trey Thompkins and the 8th overall pick in the 2013 NBA Draft, Kentavious Caldwell-Pope. On March 10, 2018, Georgia announced Fox would not return for a 10th season.

California
On March 29, 2019, it was announced that Fox would be hired as the new head coach at the University of California, Berkeley, for the Golden Bears.  He was the school's 18th head coach all time.  After four years and a record of 38-87, Cal fired Fox on March 9, 2023. Fox set a record for most losses (29) in a single season by a major conference coach in 2022-23. Fox's winning percentage at Cal (.304) is the second-worst winning percentage of any head men's basketball coach in school history.

Head coaching record

References

External links
 Biography at calbears.com

1969 births
Living people
American men's basketball coaches
American men's basketball players
Basketball coaches from Kansas
Basketball players from Kansas
California Golden Bears men's basketball coaches
College men's basketball head coaches in the United States
Eastern New Mexico Greyhounds men's basketball players
Garden City Broncbusters men's basketball players
Georgia Bulldogs basketball coaches
Kansas State Wildcats men's basketball coaches
Nevada Wolf Pack men's basketball coaches
People from Garden City, Kansas
Washington Huskies men's basketball coaches